Tarbolton is a village in South Ayrshire, Scotland. It is near Failford, Mauchline, Ayr, and Kilmarnock. The old Fail Monastery was nearby and Robert Burns connections are strong, including the Bachelors' Club museum.

Meaning of place-name 

Tarbolton has been suggested as having one of three meanings:
 Village by the tor or hill, from Old English torr 'tor, hill, cliff' and boðl-tun /bothl-tun "village with buildings, equivalent to Bolton in Greater Manchester. The name was recorded as Torbolten in 1138, suggesting this origin.
 Village by the field and hill, from Old English torr 'tor, hill, cliff' and bāll 'field (not meaning the same as ball 'ball', i.e. football), as in Dunball, Somerset, with tun 'farm, village'.  The name's record in writing as Torballtone in 1209 suggests this origin may be possible.
 Village by the hill, from Old Gaelic tor, modern Gaelic tòrr, (where the Old English word is derived from, and baile "village, usually Bally- in Irish place-names, with the tautologous Old English tun "farm, village" added by Anglo-Saxon settlers who did not understand the language. Records of the name as Torbalyrtune in 1148 suggest this origin.

Location 
It has a school, church, a gospel hall, two pubs, and is home to the Bachelors' Club, a frequent haunt of Robert Burns. The village is in the Cumnock and Doon Valley (it is strange that Tarbolton falls under South Ayrshire Council when its postcode is KA5 which links to Mauchline, East Ayrshire

The monastery and later castle of Fail existed at the hamlet of that name near Fail Toll. Fail Loch once covered a significant area however it survives now only as an area liable to flooding.

Nearby going towards Failford was the Old Montgomery Castle or Coilsfield House where one of Robert Burns's loves worked.

Tarbolton Primary takes pupils from surrounding farms and from Failford, a small hamlet north of the village. Its houses are Fail, Afton, Coyle and Montgomery, named after local areas and rivers.

Famous residents 
Alexander Tait, the poet, was a tailor by trade, and lived in Tarbolton for many years. He was a contemporary and critic of Robert Burns of Lochlie Farm and David Sillar of Spittalside Farm.
Jimmy Hay, who captained Celtic between 1906 and 1911, and Billy Price, who played for Celtic between 1961 and 1964, were from Tarbolton.
Retired footballer Kris Boyd was also born and raised in the village.
Boxer Evan Armstrong, who was British Featherweight Champion from 17 September 1973 until 8 July 1974.
John "Ian" (Mighty Mouse) McLauchlan, a Scottish Rugby Union Footballer from 1969 until 1979, was born and raised in the village.
Winner of Britain's Got Talent (series 5) 2011, singer Jai McDowall, is also from Tarbolton.
Kris Scott, award winning Scottish film director and actor.

References

External links

Video footage and history of Tarbolton Motte or Hood's Hill
Video on the poem 'Death and Dr Hornbook'.

 
Villages in South Ayrshire